Anna-Geneviève Greuze (sometimes Anne-Geneviève) (1762–1842) was a French painter.

Born in Paris, Greuze was the daughter and pupil of Jean-Baptiste Greuze, and lived with him until his death. She was known as a genre and portrait painter, but it is highly likely that much of her surviving work has been confused with that of her father. A handful of pastels attributed to her by family tradition survived in the collection of the descendants of sculptor Henri-Zozime de Valori until 2009.

References

1762 births
1842 deaths
French women painters
18th-century French painters
18th-century French women artists
19th-century French painters
19th-century French women artists
Pastel artists
Painters from Paris